The Church of the Visitation, in Westphalia, Texas, was once the largest wooden structure west of the Mississippi River. This Catholic church in the Roman Catholic Diocese of Austin, completed in 1895, has twin towers which can be seen for miles. A school was constructed in 1896 and operated as a parochial school until 1935.

The church received official recognition with the erection of an official Texas Historical Marker on December 31, 1978. On May 15, 1996, the community was recognized as the Westphalia Rural Historic District. The district is now listed in the National Register of Historic Places.

On July 29, 2019, the building caught fire and burned to the ground.

References

Roman Catholic churches in Texas
The Church of the Visitation
Buildings and structures in Falls County, Texas
Historic district contributing properties in Texas
National Register of Historic Places in Falls County, Texas